Paul Julian Douglas (born 12 October 1971) is a former English cricketer.  Douglas was a right-handed batsman who bowled right-arm fast-medium.  He was born in Barnstaple, Devon.

Douglas made his debut for Suffolk in the 1993 Minor Counties Championship against Bedfordshire.  Douglas played 3 further Minor Counties Championship matches in 1993. In what was his only season with the county, he made a single List A appearance against Essex in the 1993 NatWest Trophy.  In this match, he bowled 12 wicket-less overs for the cost of 54 runs, while with the bat he scored 2 runs before being dismissed by Saleem Malik.

References

External links
Paul Douglas at ESPNcricinfo
Paul Douglas at CricketArchive

1971 births
Living people
Sportspeople from Barnstaple
English cricketers
Suffolk cricketers